The 2016–17 season of the  Campeonato Nacional was played by 16 teams. The winners were S.L. Benfica.

Teams

References

Futsal competitions in Portugal